The Roman Catholic Diocese of Benguela is a diocese located in the city of Benguela in the Ecclesiastical province of Huambo in Angola.

History
 6 June 1970: Established as Diocese of Benguela from the Diocese of Nova Lisboa (now the Archdiocese of Huambo).
9 June 1992: Enjoyed a papal visit by Pope John Paul II

Special churches
The Cathedral of the diocese is Our Lady of Fatima Cathedral in Benguela.

Bishops

Bishops of Benguela
 Armando Amaral dos Santos (6 June 1970 – 14 October 1973)
 Oscar Lino Lopes Fernandes Braga (20 November 1974 – 18 February 2008)
 Eugenio Dal Corso, PSDP (18 February 2008 – 26 March 2018), elevated to Cardinal in 2019
 António Francisco Jaca, SVD (26 March 2018 – present)

Auxiliary Bishops
 Estêvão Binga (3 November 2021–present)

Other priests of this diocese who became bishops
Mário Lucunde, appointed Bishop of Menongue in 2005
Emílio Sumbelelo, appointed Coadjutor Bishop of Uije in 2006

See also
Roman Catholicism in Angola

References

External links 
 GCatholic.org

Benguela
Christian organizations established in 1970
Benguela
Roman Catholic dioceses and prelatures established in the 20th century
Benguela, Roman Catholic Diocese of